Pontus Joakim Gårdinger (born 20 July 1964 in Enskede) is a Swedish television presenter show host, producer and actor who has, among other things, hosted Melodifestivalen 1996. He also hosted the short lived reality show Miljonärerna on Kanal 5. He has also produced the Swedish TV show Grattis världen and his comic speeches "Tal till nationen" is among many considered to be his most important works.

Gårdinger won the Poker Million competition 2007, where the first prize was SEK 1 million.

Since 2014, he has presented the Swedish version of Jeopardy!

Selected filmography
2002 – The Dog Trick
2001 – Pusselbitar (TV-series)
2000 – Naken
1995 – NileCity 105,6 (TV-series)

References

External links 

1964 births
Living people
Swedish television personalities
Entertainers from Stockholm
Swedish television producers
Swedish male television actors